Narsai (sometimes spelt Narsay, Narseh or Narses; , Narsai, name derived from Pahlavi Narsēh from Avestan Nairyō.saȵhō, meaning 'potent utterance', the name of a yazata) was one of the foremost of Assyrian poet-theologians, perhaps equal in stature to Jacob of Serugh, both second only to Mar Aprem of Nisibis. He is the most important writer of the East Syriac Christianity after Mar Aprem. Narsai is highly venerated in the Churches that descend from the Church of the East which are the  Assyrian Church of the East, the Ancient Church of the East, Chaldean Catholic Church and the Syro-Malabar Catholic Church, in which he is known as the 'Flute of the Holy Spirit'. Although many of his works seem to have been lost, around eighty of his mêmrê survive., or verse homilies are extant.

Life
Narsai was born at ‘Ain Dulba in the district of Ma‘alta in the Sassanid Empire (today in Dahuk Governorate, Iraq). Being orphaned at an early age, he was raised by his uncle, who was head of the monastery of Kfar Mari near Beth Zabdai. Narsai spent ten years as a student at the School of Edessa, and later returned there to teach (c. 437), eventually becoming head of the school. Perhaps in 471, Narsai left Edessa after disagreeing with the city's bishop Cyrus (471–498). With the help of his friend Barsauma, who was bishop of Nisibis (although Narsai and Barsauma's wife do not seem to have seen eye-to-eye), Narsai re-established the School of Nisibis. When his former school was ordered closed by Zeno in 489, it seems that many of his faithful staff and students came to join Narsai in Nisibis. Evidence from the first Statutes of the School of Nisibis, drafted in 496, shows that Narsai was still alive, and he must have been a venerable old teacher in his nineties. Narsai died sometime early in the sixth century and was buried in Nisibis in a church that was later named after him. Joseph Huzaya was one of his pupils.

All of Narsai's extant works belong to the distinctive Syriac literary genre of the mêmrâ, or homily in verse. He employs two different metres — one with couplets of seven syllables per line, the other with twelve. The mêmrê were designed to be recited in church or religious school, and each one being an exposition of a particular religious theme. The later Syriac writer Abdisho bar Berika of Nisibis suggests that Narsai wrote 360 mêmrê in twelve volumes along with prose commentaries on large sections of the Old Testament and a book entitled On the Corruption of Morals. However, only eighty mêmrê remain, and none of his prose works.

Works
 Major collection of Narsai's works, containing the full text of 47 memre and the incipits of 34 more —

Works in modern translation 
 Six memre on creation — 
 Four memre on baptism and eucharist — it is now academic consensus is that Homily 17 is not by Narsai, but must be from the sixth century — .
 Five memre on dominical feasts — Christmas, Epiphany, Passion, Easter, Ascension — these show Narsai's christological opposition to Cyril of Alexandria in a few places — 
 Six memre on Old Testament topics — Enoch and Elijah, Flood, Blessings of Noah, Tower of Babel, Tabernacle, Brazen Serpent — 
 Five memre on Parables of Jesus — Ten Virgins, Prodigal Son, Rich man and Lazarus, Workers in the Vineyard, Wheat and Tares — 
 Memra on the Three Doctors (Diodore of Tarsus, Nestorius and Theodore of Mopsuestia) —

References

Further reading
 
 
 
 

Christians in the Sasanian Empire
Syriac writers